Smithville Christian High School is an independent Christian secondary school in Smithville, Ontario. It was established in 1980 as an extension of Hamilton District Christian High School. It is a member of the Ontario Alliance of Christian Schools.

References

External links
Smithville Christian High School

High schools in the Regional Municipality of Niagara
Private schools in Ontario